Orange is an album by bassist/composer Mario Pavone recorded in 2003 and released on the Playscape label.

Reception

Allmusic stated, "Pavone's agreeable music should hold appeal for listeners of both inside and outside persuasions, from those enamored of hard bop and post-bop through to those favoring more open-ended styles of jazz exploration". In All About Jazz Jeff Stockton observed, "while these tunes keep chaos at bay with tightly composed melodies, chaos is given its due through the exciting and risky soloing of the musicians".

Track listing
All compositions by Mario Pavone.
 "Blue Rex" – 7:49
 "Triple Diamond" – 5:13
 "Sky Tango" – 11:22
 "Drop Op" – 6:14
 "Rebass Song" – 4:05
 "Burnt Sweet Orange" – 4:52
 "Goorootoo" – 8:53
 "Box in Orange" – 4:51
 "Language" – 2:44

Personnel
Mario Pavone – bass
Steven Bernstein – trumpet, slide trumpet, arranger
Tony Malaby – tenor saxophone
Peter Madsen – piano
Gerald Cleaver – drums
Michael Musillami – arranger (track 4)

References

2003 albums
Mario Pavone albums